Norman William Owen (16 March 1915 – 9 September 1977) was an English cricketer.  Owen was a right-handed batsman who bowled both right-arm off break and right-arm medium-fast.  He was born in Shepherd's Bush, London.

Having played for the Surrey Second XI in 1934 and 1935 in the Minor Counties Championship, Owen joined Durham following World War II.  He made his debut for the county in the Minor Counties Championship against the Yorkshire Second XI.  He played Minor counties cricket for Durham from 1947 to 1955, making 59 appearances for the county.  He made a single first-class appearance for the Minor Counties against Kent in 1951.  In this match, he was dismissed in the Minor Counties first-innings by Brian Edrich for 14 runs, while in their second-innings (in which they followed-on) he scored 12 runs before being dismissed by the same bowler.  In Kent's only innings, he took the wicket of Dicky Mayes for the cost of 33 runs from 14 overs.  Kent went on to win the match by an innings and 10 runs.

He died on 9 September 1977 at Newton Aycliffe, County Durham.

References

External links

1915 births
1977 deaths
People from Shepherd's Bush
Cricketers from Greater London
English cricketers
Durham cricketers
Minor Counties cricketers